Sportivnaya is the name of several Russian metro stations:
Sportivnaya (Kharkiv Metro)
Sportivnaya (Moscow Metro)
Sportivnaya (Novosibirsk Metro), a station of the Novosibirsk Metro 
Sportivnaya (Saint Petersburg Metro)
Sportivnaya (Samara Metro)
Sportivnaya (Ufa Metro), a proposed station of the Ufa Metro, Bashkortostan

See also
Spartywnaya (Minsk Metro)